Geeshat Panditharatne (born 9 October 1996) is a Sri Lankan cricketer. He made his List A debut for Bloomfield Cricket and Athletic Club in the 2018–19 Premier Limited Overs Tournament on 4 March 2019. He made his first-class debut for Bloomfield Cricket and Athletic Club in Tier B of the 2018–19 Premier League Tournament on 11 February 2019.

References

External links
 

1996 births
Living people
Sri Lankan cricketers
Bloomfield Cricket and Athletic Club cricketers
Place of birth missing (living people)